"Like Eating Glass" is a song by Bloc Party from their debut album Silent Alarm. It is the first track on the album. The song is one of their most popular amongst fans. The lyrics, as is typical of the band's early work, are poetic and ambiguous, and deal with feelings of being "completely disoriented" in failing relationships. A fan-made music video for the song was uploaded to YouTube and has received over 1.1 million views. The Black Strobe remix was released as a split single with The Futureheads by Oxfam. The song was also featured on the playlist of Tony Hawk's American Wasteland.

Remixes 
There are two remixes of the song. A remix by Ladytron was commissioned for Bloc Party's remix album "Silent Alarm Remixed".

The Black Strobe Remix was released on a 10" picture disc split single (by Bloc Party and The Futureheads) given away free by T-Mag. It came included with the book The Beat about "the art of rhythm", which included contributions from Dave Grohl of Foo Fighters, Paul Thomson of Franz Ferdinand, Charlie Watts of The Rolling Stones, as well as Matt Tong of Bloc Party and Dave Hyde of The Futureheads. It has Shy Child's remix of the song "Decent Days And Nights" by The Futureheads on side A, with Black Strobe's remix of "Like Eating Glass" on side B.

Track listing

References

External links 
Like Eating Glass (Black Strobe Remix) - free download from BlocParty.net

BlocParty.net - Other Releases (page 2)

Bloc Party songs
2006 songs
Song recordings produced by Paul Epworth
Songs written by Kele Okereke
Songs written by Gordon Moakes
Songs written by Russell Lissack
Songs written by Matt Tong